John Robert "Bobby" Wright (born March 30, 1942) is an American country music singer. He is the middle child and the only son of country singers Johnnie Wright and Kitty Wells.

Biography
He was born in Charleston, West Virginia, United States. Most of his boyhood years were spent in Louisiana, since his parents were regular performers on the country music television program Louisiana Hayride. At age eight, Wright appeared with his parents on the show, and became part of their recordings three years later. The family went back to Nashville in 1958, because his parents became headliners at the Grand Ole Opry.

Although Wright was an able guitarist and vocalist, he had little interest in a music career. He became interested in acting when he learned that Peter Tewksbury, a television and film director, had a role for a young Southern boy who could play the guitar. Wright made the trip to Hollywood to test for Tewksbury. While he did not get the role he went to California for, his screen test was seen by the producer of McHale's Navy, who cast him in the new television comedy as Willy Moss, the PT-73 radio operator, a role he played through the entire series.

While McHale's Navy was still in production, Wright decided to give music a try, beginning by working with his mother on one of her 1965 albums. Unhappy with the Hollywood scene after McHale's Navy ended, he moved back to Nashville to start a music career.

Bobby Wright recorded for Decca, ABC and United Artists Records between 1967 and 1979, charting 21 singles on the Hot Country Songs charts. "Here I Go Again", which reached number 13 in 1971, was his highest-charting release.

Wright appeared with his parents and sisters, Ruby and Carol Sue, on the Kitty Wells Family Show a syndicated television show in the early 1960s. He also toured with his parents from the 1960s until Johnnie and Kitty retired from the road in 2007. Bobby performed with his parents at the International Festival of Country Music at Wembley in 1974, and returned to the United Kingdom with them for the Peterborough Country Music Festival in 1988. He was married to the former Brenda Kay Davis; the couple has two daughters, Theresa LeAnn and Kamela Lynn.

, Wright is the last surviving cast member from the McHale's Navy television series.

Discography

Albums

Singles

References

1942 births
ABC Records artists
American country singer-songwriters
American male singer-songwriters
Decca Records artists
Country musicians from West Virginia
Musicians from Charleston, West Virginia
United Artists Records artists
Living people
Singer-songwriters from West Virginia